Innocent is a 1999 French drama film directed and written by Costa Natsis.

Cast

Jacques Bonnaffé as  Maxime 
Elisabeth Depardieu as  Claire 
Jean-Pierre Léaud as  Le poète 
Laura Schiffman as  Agnès 
Caroline Ducey as  Anne 
François Berléand as  Jean-René 
Étienne Chicot as  The Taxi Driver

External links

Innocent at AlloCiné

1999 films
French drama films
1990s French-language films
1990s French films